The Pointe aux Chenes River is a  river on the Upper Peninsula of Michigan in the United States. It begins at the outlet of Round Lake and flows south in a winding course through the extensive Pointe aux Chenes Marshes to Lake Michigan.

See also
List of rivers of Michigan

References

Michigan  Streamflow Data from the USGS

Rivers of Michigan
Tributaries of Lake Michigan